Oliver Patrick Gildart (born 6 August 1996) is an English professional rugby league footballer who plays as a  for the Dolphins in the Australian National Rugby League. 

He has previously played for the Wests Tigers and Sydney Roosters in the NRL, the Wigan Warriors in the Super League, and spent time on loan from Wigan at Workington Town in the Kingstone Press Championship and the Salford Red Devils in the Super League.

Gildart was the winner of the 2017 Super League Young Player Of The Year. He won the 2016 and the 2018 Super League Grand Final with Wigan.

Early life
Gildart was born in Hindley, Greater Manchester, England to parents Claire and Ian, a former professional rugby league footballer for Wigan, Wakefield, and Oldham. He is of Italian descent through his mother, and is eligible to represent the Italian national team.

Club career

2015
A product of Wigan's junior system, Gildart made his Super League début on loan for Salford Red Devils in 2015, making a total of three appearances before returning to his parent club. He made his début for Wigan in the Super 8s match against Warrington Wolves on 21 August 2015, scoring a try. He then kept his place in the Wigan team for the remainder of the 2015 season, including an appearance in the 2015 Super League Grand Final at Old Trafford in only his tenth career match.

2016
Gildart continued to show promise throughout the course of the 2016 season. One of the signature tries of the year was scored by him in an away match in Perpignan as he straightened up the line and seared his way to the try-line after a flowing length-of-the-field attack by Wigan. He became a fixture in the centres for Wigan. Gildart scored a try in the 2016 Super League Grand Final against the Warrington Wolves which brought Wigan level at 6–6 before they'd go on to win 12–6 at Old Trafford.

2017 
He was also part of the Wigan team who defeated NRL champions, the Cronulla-Sutherland Sharks 22–6 to win the World Club Challenge, which ensured Oliver would join father Ian (who was an interchange in the 1987 and 1991 wins) as a World Club Challenge medal winner. Oliver also scored a try in that game. After starting the season is great form he broke three vertebrae in his back following a Brett Ferres 'crusher' tackle. Gildart was ruled out for three months. He returned with a try against the Leigh Centurions on 8 June. He scored a few weeks later against the Warrington Wolves followed by a brace against Leeds. In the Challenge Cup semi-final against Salford he scored another brace and went on to score another try in the 2017 Challenge Cup Final defeat by Hull F.C. at Wembley Stadium.

Against traditional rivals St. Helens he scored the opening try followed by a slick move within the first two minutes. Just a few moments later following a Ben Barba mistake he raced 40 yards to complete his brace.

2018
He played in the 2018 Super League Grand Final victory over the Warrington Wolves at Old Trafford.

2019
Gildart played 32 games for Wigan in 2019 including their shock semi-final loss against Salford.

2020

Gildart played in the 2020 Super League Grand Final which Wigan lost 8–4 against St Helens.

2021
On 31 May, Gildart signed a two-year deal to join NRL side, the Wests Tigers.

In round 10 of the 2021 Super League season, Gildart scored two tries for Wigan in a 18–8 defeat against Hull Kingston Rovers.

2022
In round 1 of the 2022 NRL season, Gildart made his club debut for the Wests Tigers in their 26–16 loss against Melbourne.

In round 9, he scored his first try in the NRL during a 36–22 loss against Manly at Brookvale Oval.

On 31 July, Gildart joined the Sydney Roosters on a loan deal which would go to the end of the 2022 NRL season. He scored five tries on his debut for North Sydney in their 60-4 NSW Cup win over Newcastle. 

On 28 October, Gildart was released early from his contract with a year left from the West Tigers. 

A one-year contract with the Dolphins for 2023 was subsequently confirmed.

2023
He started his Dolphins career in a pre-season trials match in the unfamiliar position of wing.

International career
In July 2018 he was selected in the England Knights Performance squad.

He was selected in squad for the 2019 Great Britain Lions tour of the Southern Hemisphere. He made his Great Britain test debut in the defeat by Tonga.

Career Stats

References

External links
Wigan Warriors profile
SL profile

1996 births
Living people
England national rugby league team players
English rugby league players
English people of Italian descent
Great Britain national rugby league team players
North Sydney Bears NSW Cup players
People from Hindley, Greater Manchester
Rugby league centres
Rugby league players from Wigan
Salford Red Devils players
Wigan Warriors players
Workington Town players
Wests Tigers players
Western Suburbs Magpies NSW Cup players
Sydney Roosters players